Mamá mechona (International Title: Freshman Mom) is a 2014 Chilean television series, it starts with a mother of 40 years old who dreams of studying at university. The series aired on Canal 13 from March 3 to August 19, 2014 on weekdays at 8pm for 118 episodes. Directed by Germán Barriga and Camilo Sánchez, and starring by Sigrid Alegría.

Cast

Main cast
 Sigrid Alegría as Macarena Muñoz: A 40 years old mother and university student of psychology.
 Paulo Brunetti as Rafael Amenábar: The old Argentine boyfriend of Macarena, in the present he is teacher in the same university.
 Álvaro Espinoza as Andrés Mora: He is the husband of Macarena.
 Carolina Varleta as Leticia Mora: She is the sister of Andrés and university manager.

Supporting Cast
 Begoña Basauri as Silvana Cancino: She is the sister of Marisol and neighbor of the Mora's family.
 Pablo Schwarz as Reinaldo García: Husband of Marisol.
 Katyna Huberman as Marisol Cancino: Neighbor of the Mora's family, she has issues with cleanliness and excessive order.
 Álvaro Gómez as Agustín "Cucho" Valdivia: Teacher.
 Paula Sharim as Yolanda Fuentes
 Mariana Derderián as Lilian "Lili" Marín
 Hernán Contreras as Sebastián Mora
 Simón Pesutic as Benjamín Keller
 Alonso Quintero as Emmanuel Peña
 Constanza Piccoli as Millaray Valdebenito
 Francisca Walker as Paula Alcaíno
 Jaime Artus as Nicolás Alvear: Model and student.
 Daniela Nicolás as Rebeca Lorenzini
 Samuel González as Alejandro Reyes: The homosexual boy of the class.
 Dominique Gallego as Ignacia Novoa
 Catalina Castelblanco as Olivia Mora
 María Jesús Montané as Paz García
 Matias Silva as Pablo Mora
 Rodrigo Roco Contreras as Axel.
 Teresita Commentz as Colomba Castillo
 Gaspar Vigneaux as Guillermo "Memo" García.

Special participations 
 María José Prieto as Valeria García
 Mónica Godoy as Bárbara Correa
 María Gracia Subercaseaux as Daniella Illanes
 Marcela del Valle as Macarena “Macaruchi” Muñoz
 Liliana García as Aurora Larrañaga

International broadcast 
  - Astro Bella / Mustika HD (2015-2016)

References

External links 
  

2014 telenovelas
2014 Chilean television series debuts
2014 Chilean television series endings
Chilean telenovelas
Spanish-language telenovelas
Canal 13 (Chilean TV channel) telenovelas
Television shows set in Santiago